The English cricket team in Australia in 1907–08 lost the Test series, and with it the Ashes, 4–1. They were handicapped by Arthur Jones, their captain, having to miss the first three Tests through illness. Frederick Fane led the side during Jones' absence.

George Gunn, in Australia for the good of his health, was called into the touring party to bolster the batting and was a great success, scoring two hundreds including one on his Test debut, and scoring 462 runs at an average of 51.33. Nevertheless, England's batting was fragile throughout the series, with only Kenneth Hutchings scoring a hundred in addition to Gunn. Jack Hobbs made his England debut in the second Test, the only one which England won, scoring 83 and 28, and he had the next best average to Gunn. The bowling relied on Jack Crawford, Arthur Fielder and Sydney Barnes, who took 79 wickets between them.

Australia's batting was much superior to England's, with eight players averaging over 30 to England's three. Warwick Armstrong topped their batting averages, with 410 runs at 45.55. Jack Saunders took 31 wickets at 23.09, and five other bowlers contributed usefully, with between 10 and 14 wickets at an average of between 25 and 31.

England lost the first Test by only two wickets, and ought to have won the third. In the latter match, Clem Hill—coming in at number 9 in Australia's second innings because of an attack of influenza—made 160. He added 243 for the eighth wicket with "Roger" Hartigan (116), their partnership turning the match.

The tour was organised by the Marylebone Cricket Club and matches outside the Tests were played under the MCC name.

Test series summary

Match length: Timeless. Balls per over: 6. Series result: Australia won 4–1.

First Test

Second Test

Third Test

Fourth Test

Fifth Test

References

External links
 Wisden Cricketers' Almanack, 1909 edition, "The MCC's team in Australia, 1907-08"

1907 in Australian cricket
1907 in English cricket
1908 in Australian cricket
1908 in English cricket
Australian cricket seasons from 1890–91 to 1917–18
1907-08
International cricket competitions from 1888–89 to 1918
1907-08